Antanas Purėnas (16 February 1881 – 5 November 1962) was a famous Lithuanian organic chemist and politician.

Biography 

Antanas was born in Tatkonys, Kupiškis, Lithuania (then Empire of Russia). After completing Liepaja gymnasium, he was studying in Tartu in 1902–1904 and in Saint Petersburg from which he graduated in 1912.

Scientific career 
Since 1951 he had been the professor of Kaunas Polytechnic Institute.

Politician career 
Purėnas participated in revolution held in 1905–1907, therefore he was prosecuted by the police.  In 1918 he joined LSDP, Lithuanian teachers union and teachers association "Naujoji mokykla". In 1920 he was a delegate of LSDP in Constituent Assembly of Lithuania, Chairman of educational committee.

Lithuanian chemists
Lithuanian politicians
1881 births
1962 deaths
Organic chemists
Academic staff of the Kaunas University of Technology
Soviet chemists